Zhongxiao Fuxing (formerly transliterated as Chunghsiao Fuhsing Station until 2003) is a metro station in Taipei, Taiwan served by Taipei Metro. It had a ridership of 20.688 million entries and exits in 2017.

Station overview
The station has both underground and elevated sections: two levels are underground (servicing Blue Line) and four levels above ground (servicing Brown Line). The station has two side platforms, one island platform, and five exits. Brown Line platforms are equipped with platform screen doors and Blue Line platforms are equipped with automatic platform gates. Washrooms are located inside and outside the paid area of the station.

The station is situated at the intersection of Zhongxiao East Road and Fuxing South Road. The station features four long escalators directly connecting the B3 concourse level with the third-floor platforms. These escalators handle 96,000 transferring passengers daily. The station can be very crowded during rush hour due to its status as a major transfer station between two lines.

Exit 2 is integrated with the Pacific Sogo Department Store (Fuxing Branch) as part of a joint development project. It is the first business-oriented building based on a Taipei Metro joint development project. In 2010, the station was awarded a "Superior" award at the 8th Golden Thumb Awards (sponsored by the Executive Yuan) for the joint development project.

History
28 March 1996: Opened for service along with the opening of Brown Line.
24 December 1999: Became a major transfer station with the opening of the segment from Taipei City Hall to Longshan Temple station of the Blue Line.
10 November 2004: The connection between exit 4 and Pacific SOGO Department Store Zhongxiao Branch opened.
19 June 2006: The main connecting escalators gave off thick smoke, resulting in many trains bypassing the station.
1 December 2006: Automatic platform gates were installed on Blue Line, as first batch of installation among Taipei Main Station.

Station layout

Exits
Exit 1: Intersection of Zhongxiao E. Rd. Sec. 3 and Andong St.
Exit 2: Intersection of Zhongxiao E. Sec. 3, Sec. 4 and Fuxing S. Rd. Sec. 1 
Exit 3: Intersection of Zhongxiao E. Rd. Sec. 4 and Daan Rd. Sec. 1
Exit 4: Zhongxiao E. Rd. Sec. 4
Exit 5: Fuxing S. Rd. Sec. 1

Around the station
 Breeze Center - exit 5
 Shiatzy Chen (Daan Store)
 Central Clinic and Hospital
 Republic of China Air Force Headquarters
 Taiwan Contemporary Culture Lab
 SOGO Mall (Zhongxiao Branch - exit 4, Fuxing Branch - exit 2)
 Howard Plaza Hotel - exit 2
 Taipei City Hospital (Renai Branch)
 Huaisheng Elementary School
 Huaisheng Junior High School

Underground market
East Metro Mall (connects directly to the station, toward Zhongxiao Dunhua)

References

Wenhu line stations
Bannan line stations
Railway stations opened in 1996